Veg nutrition may refer to:

 Vegetable nutrition, see vegetable
 Vegetarian nutrition
 Vegan nutrition